The 1998 Kentucky Wildcats football team represented the University of Kentucky in the 1998 NCAA Division I-A football season. Quarterback Tim Couch was the first pick overall in the 1999 NFL Draft.

Season
Couch led Kentucky to seven wins, including a win on the road at #21 LSU and a spot in the 1999 Outback Bowl, where Couch completed 30 of 48 passes for 336 yards and two touchdowns, though Kentucky lost to Penn State, 26–14.  In the Kentucky–Louisville rivalry, the Wildcats beat the Cardinals to claim the Governor's Cup.  In the Border Battle, Tennessee beat Kentucky by a score of 59–21 to claim the Beer Barrel.

Schedule

Roster

1999 NFL Draft

References

Kentucky
Kentucky Wildcats football seasons
Kentucky Wildcats football